Year 1252 (MCCLII) was a leap year starting on Monday (link will display the full calendar) of the Julian calendar.

Events 
 By place 

 Europe 
 April 6 – Saint Peter of Verona is assassinated by Carino of Balsamo.
 May 15 – Pope Innocent IV issues the papal bull Ad exstirpanda, which authorizes the torture of heretics in the Medieval Inquisition. Torture quickly gains widespread usage across Catholic Europe.
June 1 – Alfonso X is proclaimed king of Castile and León.
July – The settlement of Stockholm in Sweden is founded, by Birger Jarl.
 December 25 – Christopher I of Denmark is crowned King of Denmark, in the Lund Cathedral.
 The Polish land of Lebus is incorporated into the German state of Brandenburg, marking the start of Brandenburg's expansion into previously Polish areas (Neumark).
 The Lithuanian city of Klaipėda (Memel) is founded by the Teutonic Knights.
 The town and monastery of Orval Abbey in Belgium burn to the ground; rebuilding takes 100 years.
 Thomas Aquinas travels to the University of Paris, to begin his studies there for a master's degree.
 In astronomy, work begins on the recording of the Alfonsine tables.

 Asia 
 The classic Japanese text Jikkunsho is completed.
 The Chinese era Chunyou ends.
 The Mongols take the westernmost province of the Song dynasty empire.

Births 
 March 25 – Conradin, Duke of Swabia (d. 1268)
 Safi-ad-din Ardabili, Persian Sufi leader
 Eleanor de Montfort, Princess of Wales, English-born consort (d. 1282)

Deaths 
 January 1 – Saint Zdislava Berka, Bohemian lay Dominican benefactress
 January 23 – Isabella, Queen of Armenia
 January – Bohemond V, Prince of Antioch
 February 3 – Sviatoslav III of Vladimir, Prince of Novgorod (b. 1196)
 April 1 – Kujō Michiie, Japanese regent
 April 6 – Saint Peter of Verona
 May 3 or May 4 – Günther von Wüllersleben, Grand Master of the Teutonic Knights
 May 30 – King Ferdinand III of Castile and Leon
 June 6 – Robert Passelewe, Bishop of Chichester
 June 9 – Otto I, Duke of Brunswick-Lüneburg
 June 29 – Abel, King of Denmark (b. 1218)
 August 1 – Giovanni da Pian del Carpine, Italian chronicler of the Mongol Empire
 November 27 – Blanche of Castile, queen of Louis VIII of France and regent of France (b. 1188)
 date unknown
John of Basingstoke, English scholar and ecclesiastic
Henry I, Count of Anhalt
Sorghaghtani Beki, Mongolian empress and regent
Catherine Sunesdotter, Swedish queen consort
Yesü Möngke, Khan of the Chagatai Khanate

References